The 1967 Alberta general election was held on May 23, 1967, to elect members of the Legislative Assembly of Alberta to the 16th Alberta Legislature. The election was called after the 15th Alberta Legislature was prorogued on April 11, 1967, and dissolved on April 14, 1967.

Ernest C. Manning led the Social Credit Party to its ninth consecutive majority government, winning 55 of the 65 seats in the legislature, despite getting less than 45 per cent of the popular vote. Although it was not apparent at the time, this proved to be an ominous sign for the party. The 1967 election was the first time the Social Credit government had won less than half the popular vote since 1955.

The once-moribund Progressive Conservatives, led by young lawyer Peter Lougheed, emerged as the main opposition to Social Credit.  They won over a quarter of the popular vote and six seats, mostly in Calgary and Edmonton. Social Credit was slow to adapt to the changes in Alberta as its two largest cities gained increasing influence.

Despite losing close to half of the share of the popular vote they had won in the 1963 election, the Liberals managed to increase their number of seats from two to three as a result of the decline in the Social Credit vote.

New Democrat Party candidates received 16 percent of the vote but no seats.

Voters also decided upon the adoption of daylight saving time, in a province-wide plebiscite. It was defeated by a very slim margin with 51.25 per cent voting against.

Amendments to the Election Act in 1965 provided voting rights for Treaty Indians in provincial elections, making the 1967 election the first opportunity for Indigenous Albertans to vote in a provincial election.

Background

Social Credit campaign 
The Social Credit government had prepared well for the election in advance, with the party maintaining a significant war chest. The Social Credit government came under criticism for low non-renewable resource royalty rates compared to other developed nations, which it counted by saying the royalties were the highest in Canada. Social Credit focused on their governance record rather than make significant policy commitments, although the Social Credit government did commit to study rising car insurance rates. Furthermore the Social Credit government argued they spent the most per capita on social issues despite having the lowest tax rate.

An internal controversy occurred when Albert Bourcier, a Social Credit MLA from 1935–1952 filed papers to contest the Edmonton-Jasper Place constituency against incumbent Social Credit MLA John Horan. Bourcier was still an active member of the Social Credit Party, but was ejected from the party prior to the election. It was the second time Bourcier was ejected from the party, the first being in 1949 as a sitting MLA. Horan was re-elected with 36.3 per cent of the vote, while Bourcier received 1.5 per cent of the vote.

New Democratic Party campaign 

The New Democratic Party (NDP) built a campaign on the foundation of higher oil royalties, greater participation by small businesses in oil and gas resources, transition electricity utilities to provincial ownership, provide for provincial car insurance, and development of rural natural gas infrastructure.

Progressive Conservative campaign 

New leader Peter Lougheed and his supporters worked tirelessly to convince candidates to run in all 65 constituencies, however the Progressive Conservatives were only able to nominate 47 candidates, two more than the Liberal Party, but less than a full slate put forward by the Social Credit Party and the New Democratic Party. Lougheed sought candidates who were already public figures, often meeting with editors of local weekly newspapers, mayors and presidents of boards of trade to inquire who the community's leaders were. As the writ came closer Lougheed and the Progressive Conservative realized they could not form government and instead focused on a strategy of capturing Lougheed's seat in Calgary-West and forming opposition. The campaign created red, white and blue promotional materials with the slogan "Alberta Needs an Alternative", while Lougheed's own material added his personal slogan "Let's Start It in Calgary West".

Lougheed sought a public debate amongst the four party leaders, however as a long time incumbent Manning was not willing to risk a debate which could not benefit him. Manning's position on the debate changed when a group of Edmonton church leaders decided to host a leaders debate, Manning a devout Christian and host of "Back to the Bible Hour" radio broadcasts accepted the debate. Lougheed's performance in the debate was lauded by the Edmonton Journal and was credited by biographer George Wood with the growth in the Conservative movement in the Edmonton area, including Don Getty's improbable victory over Social Credit Education Minister Randolph McKinnon in Strathcona West. Other media began to take notice with Maclean's stating the only politician capable of having "an outside chance of challenging Manning" was Lougheed.

During the campaign, the Progressive Conservatives called for the sale of Alberta Government Telephones.

Lougheed was subsequently elected to the legislature in Calgary-West capturing 62 per cent of the vote, and the Progressive Conservatives captured 26 per cent of the vote province-wide with five other successful candidates, and subsequently Lougheed became Leader of the Opposition. The group of elected Conservatives known as the "original six" included Calgary MLAs Len Werry, David Russell; Edmonton area MLAs Lou Hyndman and Don Getty, and the party's only rural candidate and former federal Member of Parliament Hugh Horner. The Edmonton Journal positively remarked on Lougheed's success following the 1967 election, stating Albertans had a responsible and credible alternative as opposition.

Eligibility to vote 

The 1967 Alberta general election had four sets of criteria for a person to be eligible to vote. A eligible voter must be a Canadian citizen or British subject prior to April 14, 1967; 19 years of age or older on voting day; a resident of Alberta for 12 months preceding April 14, 1967; and a resident of the constituency on April 14, 1967. Indigenous Albertans were eligible to vote for the first time in a provincial general election.

Results

Note:

* Party did not nominate candidates in the previous election

Daylight saving time plebiscite

The Province of Alberta voted on its fifth provincial plebiscite. Voters were asked to endorse a proposal to adopt daylight saving time (summer time). The proposal was rejected by a very slim margin. The question was asked again in the next election, and passed at that time.

Background 
In 1948, the Government of Alberta formally set the province's time zone with the passage of The Daylight Saving Time Act, which mandated the entire province observe Mountain Standard Time, and prevented any municipality from observing daylight saving time or any other time zone. The bill came after Calgary (1946 and 1947), and Edmonton (1946) held municipal plebiscites which approved the move to daylight saving time. Edmonton under Mayor Harry Ainlay actually began to use DLT, which was forbidden under the new law.

Alberta's urban municipalities were in favour of daylight saving time and pressured the provincial government to hold a plebiscite or provide the authority for municipalities to locally observe daylight saving time. A joint motion of Calgary City Council and Edmonton City Council for a plebiscite was put to the Legislature in July 1963, with the support of Social Credit Minister and Edmonton Alderman Ethel Sylvia Wilson, without success. 

A further effort in March 1964 by Liberal MLA and Calgary Alderman Bill Dickie to allow the mater to be settled by a municipal plebiscite also failed in the Legislature. Inhe debate, Social Credit MLA William Patterson described daylight saving time as "that fandangled thing", and Minister Allen Russell Patrick stated municipal daylight savings time would be difficult for tourists to understand.

A motion introduced by Bill Dickie was approved by the Legislature in February 1966 to hold a plebiscite on daylight saving time. And on March 29, 1966, Minister Alfred Hooke introduced An Act to amend The Daylight Saving Time Act (Bill 75), to permit the government to hold a plebiscite on the issue. 

On April 17, 1967 the Government of Alberta approved Order-in-Council 607/67 which provided the instructions for the plebiscite on daylight saving time. 

The prescribed question was "Do you favour Province-wide Daylight Saving Time?" with the two available responses as "Yes" and "No".

Across Canada, by 1967, each province besides Alberta and Saskatchewan had adopted daylight saving time. Many Alberta businesses provided for modified summer hours, including the Alberta Stock Exchange which started at 7 a.m. to align with exchanges in Toronto and Montreal. Air Canada released a statement expressing the difficulty of distributing flight schedules with flights in Alberta.

Arguments for and against 

Arguments for daylight saving time were put forward by the construction industry including the Alberta Construction Association and Edmonton Home Builders Association. The Calgary Herald editorial board published a number of editorials in advance of the plebiscite advocating for the province to observe daylight saving time, and further advocated for all of Canada to move to daylight saving time. Calgary residents and businessmen Bill Creighton and David Matthews led a campaign for daylight saving times, arguing the benefits of an additional hour of late sunlight for sports. Creighton was able to garner endorsements from the Alberta Amateur Athletics Union and other local golf, baseball, football and tennis associations. The Calgary Tourist and Convention Association endorsed daylight saving, noting that tourists perceived the province as "backwards" for not adopting the time shift. Liberal leader Michael Maccagno personally supported observing daylight saving time.

Arguments against daylight saving time were made by the group Alberta Council for Standard Time founded by Calgary lawyer and drive-in movie operator R.H. Barron. The Council ran a number of advertisements in local papers advocating for standard time, those arguments included the danger for children walking to school in the dark or twilight, and possible reductions to academic performance.

Aftermath 
The plebiscite resulted in a narrow victory for retaining Mountain Standard Time, with 51.25 per cent of the population voting against daylight saving time. Alberta's large urban communities of Calgary, Edmonton, Lethbridge and Medicine Hat voted in favour, while the rural parts of the province voted against the proposal.

The new Progressive Conservative caucus continued to pressure the Social Credit government to provide individual municipalities the power to institute Daylight Saving Time. A February 1968 motion by Edmonton MLA Don Getty and Bill Dickie for municipal authority to institute daylight saving time was rejected by the Legislature.

In the aftermath of the plebiscite, the Calgary Herald blamed the defeat on "rural cousins" and the well organized Council for Standard Time, noting Calgarians voted two-to-one in favour of adopting daylight saving. The editorial board for the Calgary Herald decried the failure of the plebiscite, but predicted that the province would eventually adopt daylight saving time.

Results

Results by riding

|-
|Alexandra|||
|Anders O. Aalborg2,88057.85%
|
|Kenneth E. Oates94018.88%
|
|Charles F. Swan3046.11%
|
|Lester A. Lindgren83516.77%
|
||||
|Anders O. Aalborg
|-
|Athabasca|||
|Antonio Aloisio1,73345.08%
|
|
|
|Dave Hunter93924.43%
|
|George Opryshko1,17030.44%
|
||||
|Antonio Aloisio
|-
|Banff-Cochrane
|
|Roy Wilson2,06642.17%
|
|
|
|
|
|Jack Fraser3747.63%|||
|Clarence Copithorne (Ind.)2,42849.56%|||
|Francis Leo Gainer
|-
|Bonnyville|||
|Romeo B. Lamothe2,33954.12%
|
|
|
|
|
|Kenneth Joseph Kerr3167.31%
|
||||
|Romeo B. Lamothe
|-
|Bow Valley-Empress|||
|Fred T. Mandeville2,52549.16%
|
|
|
|
|
|Calvin Steinley54910.69%
|
| Ben M. MacLeod (Coal.)2,01839.63%
||
|William Delday
|-
|Calgary Bowness
|
|Charles E. Johnston6,46137.63%|||
|Len F. Werry6,82839.77%
|
|John Donachie1,87610.93%
|
|Evelyn Moore1,90511.09%
|
||||
|Charles E. Johnston
|-
|Calgary Centre|||
|Frederick C. Colborne3,87340.47%
|
|Charles Henry Cook3,35935.10%
|
|John Starchuk1,27513.32%
|
|Mrs. Margaret Hanley97310.17%
|
||||
|Frederick C. Colborne
|-
|Calgary-East|||
|Albert W. Ludwig5,56350.43%
|
|Jim Crawford2,61323.69%
|
|Sandy Skoryko8037.28%
|
|Kurt Gebauer1,95517.72%
|
||||
|Albert W. Ludwig
|-
|Calgary-Glenmore
|
|Len Pearson3,84027.43%
|
|Ronald M. Helmer3,40624.33%|||
|William Daniel Dickie5,74341.02%
|
|Max Wolfe9506.79%
|
||||
|William Daniel Dickie
|-
|Calgary-North|||
|Robert A. Simpson4,30842.74%
|
|Henry M. Beaumont3,91538.84%
|
|Charles W. Loughridge6386.33%
|
|Walter H. Siewert1,15711.48%
|
||||
|Robert A. Simpson
|-
|Calgary Queens Park|||
|Lea Leavitt4,94342.13%
|
|Eric Charles Musgreave3,82032.56%
|
|Darryl Raymaker1,70214.51%
|
|Lisa Baldwin1,22010.40%
|
||||
|
|-
|Calgary-South|||
|Arthur J. Dixon5,40141.76%
|
|Joe Clark4,94038.19%
|
|Willis E. O'Leary1,1468.86%
|
|Jack D. Peters1,38810.73%
|
||||
|Arthur J. Dixon
|-
|Calgary Victoria Park
|
|Art Davis3,95635.49%|||
|David J. Russell4,79643.03%
|
|Reginald J. Gibbs1,0889.76%
|
|Ted Takacs1,22911.03%
|
||||
|
|-
|Calgary-West
|
|Donald S. Fleming4,02828.95%|||
|Peter Lougheed8,54861.43%
|
|Natalie Chapman4022.89%
|
|Allan M. Early8686.24%
|
||||
|Donald S. Fleming
|-
|Camrose|||
|Chester I. Sayers3,08344.25%
|
|Emmett G. Mohler1,73624.91%
|
|G. Rod Knaut69910.03%
|
|Rudy P. Swanson1,41220.26%
|
||||
|Chester I. Sayers
|-
|Cardston|||
|Alvin F. Bullock2,12047.11%
|
|Larry L. Lang1,69237.60%
|
|
|
|Leslie N. Howard1042.31%
|
|Robert D. Burt (Ind.)57312.73%|||
|Edgar W. Hinman
|-
|Clover Bar|||
|Walt A. Buck4,10151.35%
|
|Daniel F. Hollands2,21527.73%
|
|Kazmer D. Curry4685.86%
|
|Alfred O. Arnston1,17514.71%
|
||||
|Floyd M. Baker
|-
|Cypress|||
|Harry E. Strom2,57776.65%
|
|
|
|
|
|William George McFall76922.87%
|
||||
|Harry E. Strom
|-
|Drumheller-Gleichen|||
|Gordon Edward Taylor4,01867.46%
|
|Tom Hanson1,57926.51%
|
|
|
|Garry B. Law3455.79%
|
||||
|Gordon Edward Taylor
|-
|Dunvegan|||
|Ernest L. Lee1,28041.52%
|
|
|
|
|
|Phil Thompson1,08035.03%
|
| John A. Hammond (Coal.)54718.82%
||
|Ernest L. Lee
|-
|Edmonton North|||
|Ethel Sylvia Wilson4,69838.21%
|
|Tony Thibaudeau3,46128.15%
|
|L. John Corbiere1,30310.60%
|
|Gordon S.B. Wright2,76322.47%
|
||||
|
|-
|Edmonton-Centre|||
|Ambrose Holowach3,14639.12%
|
|Harold W. Veale2,55831.81%
|
|Joseph A. Tannous7479.29%
|
|Henry Tomaschuk1,31316.33%
|
|Pat G.A. O'Hara (Ind.)1942.41%|||
|Ambrose Holowach
|-
|Edmonton-Jasper Place|||
|John William Horan4,20636.34%
|
|Gerard Joseph Amerongen3,00025.92%
|
|Barry Vogel1,85115.99%
|
|Tom Hennessey2,21019.09%
|
|Albert V. Bourcier (Ind. SoCred)176
||
|John William Horan
|-
|Edmonton-North East|||
|Lou W. Heard5,05235.02%
|
|Alan T. Cooke3,61625.06%
|
|Peter Achtem1,4189.83%
|
|Ivor G. Dent4,27629.64%
|
||||
|Lou W. Heard
|-
|Edmonton-North West|||
|Edgar H. Gerhart4,67436.10%
|
|Paul Norris4,20532.48%
|
|Thomas Leia1,1739.06%
|
|Dave Belland2,66420.58%
|
|Oscar A. Green (Ind.)1881.45%|||
|Edgar H. Gerhart
|-
|Edmonton-Norwood|||
|William Tomyn3,45043.01%
|
|Ronald W. Downey2,02325.22%
|
|
|
|Grant W. Notley2,43330.33%
|
||||
|William Tomyn
|-
|Edmonton-West
|
|William A. Johnson4,01632.46%|||
|Lou Hyndman4,75338.42%
|
|J. Bernard Feehan2,31618.72%
|
|Thomas C. Pocklington1,25410.14%
|
||||
|Stanley Gordon Geldart
|-
|Edson
|
|Arthur O. Jorgensen2,37234.59%
|
||||
|William A. Switzer2,80340.87%
|
|C. Neil Reimer1,65624.15%
|
||||
|William Switzer
|-
|Grande Prairie|||
|Ira McLaughlin4,84755.38%
|
|
|
|George M. Repka1,13212.93%
|
|Alan Bush2,74831.40%
|
||||
|Ira McLaughlin
|-
|Grouard|||
|Roy Ells3,36351.02%
|
|
|
|Gunnar Walhstrom98514.94%
|
|Stan Daniels2,20733.49%
|
||||
|Roy Ells
|-
|Hand Hills-Acadia|||
|Clinton Keith French2,67550.17%
|
|Bill Cross2,14040.14%
|
|
|
|Ralph G. Jorgenson5049.45%
|
||||
|Clinton Keith French
|-
|Lac La Biche
|
|Harry Lobay1,61334.22%
|
||||
|Michael Maccagno2,21246.93%
|
|Fred Ustina75816.08%
|
||||
|Michael Maccagno
|-
|Lac Ste. Anne
|
|William Patterson1,73130.14%|||
|Hugh F. Horner2,57344.80%
|
|Raymond Mills72312.59%
|
|Swen Symington67411.74%
|
||||
|William Patterson
|-
|Lacombe|||
|Allan Russell Patrick2,69049.11%
|
|John William Cookson1,99936.49%
|
|
|
|Glen R. Nelson77714.18%
|
||||
|Allan Russell Patrick
|-
|Leduc|||
|James D. Henderson2,19345.38%
|
|Emanuel Prycz1,20624.96%
|
|Russell Olekshy3837.93%
|
|Alex A. Sklarenko1,02121.13%
|
||||
|James D. Henderson
|-
|Lethbridge|||
|John C. Landeryou6,15544.27%
|
|Wilfred Bowns4,12829.69%
|
|John I. Boras2,23716.09%
|
|Klaas Buijert1,3359.60%
|
||||
|John C. Landeryou
|-
|Little Bow|||
|Raymond Albert Speaker3,36768.25%
|
|
|
|
|
|John K. Head57211.60%
|
|Arthur W. Ulrich (Ind.)97819.83%|||
|Raymond Albert Speaker
|-
|Macleod|||
|Leighton E. Buckwell2,82251.68%
|
|George Whitehead1,77332.47%
|
|Melba J. Cochlan1492.73%
|
|Sid J. Cornish67312.32%
|
||||
|James Hartley
|-
|Medicine Hat|||
|Harry C. Leinweber4,39039.96%
|
|James Horsman2,70124.59%
|
|Roy Weidermann2,02518.43%
|
|Ted. J. Grimm1,81916.56%
|
||||
|Harry C. Leinweber
|-
|Okotoks-High River|||
|Edward P. Benoit2,28948.50%
|
|Thomas E. Hughes2,09744.43%
|
|Ron A. Baker881.86%
|
|Georgina M. Smith2124.49%
|
||||
|Edward P. Benoit
|-
|Olds-Didsbury|||
|Robert Curtis Clark4,05265.02%
|
|
|
|Stan Bell1,12918.12%
|
|Eva Banta4857.78%
|
|Chas. Purvis (Ind. Con.)5478.80%
||
|Robert Curtis Clark
|-
|Peace River|||
|Robert H. Wiebe2,86053.49%
|
|
|
|
|
|Harry Reinders1,33825.02%
|
|Edward R. Whitney (Ind.)1,14921.49%|||
|Euell F. Montgomery
|-
|Pembina|||
|Adam Carl Muller2,86647.23%
|
|Edward G. Samuel2,09834.57%
|
|Edward P. MacCallum4847.98%
|
|George A.E. Garnett5769.49%
|
||||
|Robin D. Jorgenson
|-
|Pincher Creek-Crowsnest|||
|Charles Duncan Drain2,34545.78%
|
|Alexander B. Wells72214.10%
|
|F. Benton Murphy2554.98%
|
|Garth A. Turcott1,77234.60%
|
||||
|Garth Turcott
|-
|Ponoka|||
|Neville S. Roper3,28662.04%
|
|
|
|Derek R. Broughton5149.70%
|
|Ed Nelson1,46427.64%
|
||||
|Glen F. Johnston
|-
|Red Deer|||
|William Kenneth Ure6,16646.42%
|
|James L. Foster4,62834.84%
|
|Robert H. Scammell6364.79%
|
|Ethel Taylor1,79913.54%
|
||||
|William Kenneth Ure
|-
|Redwater|||
|Michael Senych1,58843.42%
|
|Basil Zailo1,31435.93%
|
|
|
|Norman T. Flack73720.15%
|
||||
|Michael Senych
|-
|Rocky Mountain House|||
|Alfred J. Hooke2,53853.21%
|
|
|
|
|
|Gilbert H.C. Farthing79216.60%
|
|Will Sinclair (Ind.)1,40629.48%|||
|Alfred J. Hooke
|-
|Sedgewick-Coronation|||
|Jack C. Hillman3,47059.41%
|
|Ernie Moore1,10318.88%
|
|Eugene F. Price5479.36%
|
|Arthur C. Bunney68011.64%
|
||||
|Jack C. Hillman
|-
|Spirit River|||
|Adolph O. Fimrite2,62756.12%
|
|
|
|John L. Listhaeghe4138.82%
|
|Bert M. Strand1,63434.91%
|
||||
|Adolph O. Fimrite
|-
|St. Albert|||
|Keith Everitt2,82435.44%
|
|Stanley M. Walker1,46918.43%
|
|Robert A. Russell2,29728.82%
|
|Norman Dolman1,33916.80%
|
||||
|Keith Everitt
|-
|St. Paul|||
|Raymond Reierson2,27544.29%
|
|
|
|Armand Lamothe1,48928.99%
|
|Pierre M. Vallee78815.34%
|
|Leroy P. Christensen (Ind. P.C.)57111.12%|||
|Raymond Reierson
|-
|Stettler|||
|Galen C. Norris2,65954.88%
|
|Bob McKnight1,46130.15%
|
|
|
|Morton H. Neilson63513.11%
|
||||
|Galen C. Norris
|-
|Stony Plain|||
|Ralph A. Jespersen2,31636.25%
|
|Frank Flanagan1,67026.14%
|
|
|
|Maurice R. McCullagh1,85529.03%
|
|Cornelia R. Wood (Ind. SoCred)5178.13%
||
|Cornelia R. Wood
|-
|Strathcona Centre|||
|Joseph Donovan Ross4,05240.50%
|
|Larry Boddy2,49324.92%
|
|Ian Nicoll1,79417.93%
|
|Gordon E. Weese1,62716.26%
|
||||
|Joseph Donovan Ross
|-
|Strathcona East|||
|Ernest C. Manning6,31449.70%
|
|C. Jack Thorpe2,97623.43%
|
|Percy Marshall1,45811.48%
|
|Ray Field1,90915.03%
|
||||
|Ernest C. Manning
|-
|Strathcona South|||
|Joe G. Radstaak3,93440.73%
|
|Oscar H. Kruger2,59426.86%
|
|John Kloster96810.02%
|
|Bill McLean2,12321.98%
|
||||
|
|-
|Strathcona West
|
|Randolph H. McKinnon5,15336.87%|||
|Donald Ross Getty6,76448.39%
|
|Edmund H. Leger8906.37%
|
|Frank Kuzemski1,1157.98%
|
||||
|Randolph H. McKinnon
|-
|Taber-Warner|||
|Douglas Miller3,45161.24%
|
|Emil D. Gundlock1,17020.76%
|
|Theodore Rudd68312.12%
|
|Dick Verwoerd2925.18%
|
||||
|Leonard C. Halmrast
|-
|Three Hills|||
|Raymond Ratzlaff2,76250.48%
|
|Gordon Leslie1,11320.34%
|
|James A. Lore1,31724.07%
|
|George E. Pieper2684.90%
|
||||
|Roy Davidson
|-
|Vegreville-Bruce|||
|Alex W. Gordey2,49744.41%
|
|Mike W. Kawulych1,74230.98%
|
|Wilfrid L. Horton3456.14%
|
|Albin Lukawiecki1,01017.96%
|
||||
|Alex W. Gordey
|-
|Vermilion|||
|Ashley H. Cooper2,54557.80%
|
|Hilda Wilson1,19927.23%
|
|
|
|Harry E. Yaremchuk64214.58%
|
||||
|Ashley H. Cooper
|-
|Wainwright|||
|Henry A. Ruste3,80782.15%
|
|
|
|
|
|Glenn Valleau78917.03%
|
||||
|Henry A. Ruste
|-
|Wetaskiwin|||
|Albert W. Strohschein2,87945.67%
|
|Dallas Schmidt2,40838.20%
|
|
|
|Robert P. Christensen1,00015.86%
|
||||
|Albert W. Strohschein
|-
|Willingdon-Two Hills|||
|Nicholas A. Melnyk2,16062.25%
|
|
|
|
|
|Louis Souter1,29837.41%
|
||||
|Nicholas A. Melnyk
|-
|}

See also
1948 electrification plebiscite
1957 liquor plebiscite
1971 daylight saving time plebiscite
List of Alberta political parties

References

Works cited
 

 

Primary Sources
 
 

1967 elections in Canada
1967
General election
May 1967 events in Canada